Dja-et-Lobo is a department of South Province in Cameroon. The department covers an area of 19,911 km and as of 2005 had a total population of 196,951. The capital of the department lies at Sangmélima.

Subdivisions
The department is divided administratively into 9 communes and in turn into villages.

Communes 
 Bengbis
 Djoum
 Meyomessala
 Meyomessi
 Mintom
 Oveng
 Sangmélima (urban)
 Sangmélima (rural)
 Zoétélé

See also
Communes of Cameroon

References

Departments of Cameroon
South Region (Cameroon)